The  or  is a bread in Italian cuisine from the Emilia region of Italy, prepared using flour, water and lard as primary ingredients. Cracklings are sometimes used in its preparation as well. In Emilia-Romagna, it is typically sliced into diamond shapes and then fried, and may be accompanied with cheese and salumi. When it is fried, the bread puffs up, and it may include yeast or baking soda to leaven it. Versions prepared with milk are softer than those prepared with water. It may be served either as an appetizer or as a main dish. Despite the name by which in Italy it is often referred to as a kind of gnocchi, it is technically not.

Etymology
The name crescentina is derived from the Italian verb , which means "to grow", referring to it puffing up during the cooking.

Variants
A version of the dish in the city of Bologna, Emilia-Romagna, is prepared with the bread sliced into round shapes, which are then fried. Pieces of prosciutto (thinly sliced dry-cured ham) may be incorporated into the dough.

In Tuscany, crescentina is dusted with salt or sugar after being fried, and sometimes Tuscan salami is incorporated into the dough.

Crescia is a version in the town and commune of Gubbio in the Province of Perugia that is prepared with oil and salt and baked in an oven. Its name is associated with pieces of dough that were given to children for them to play with, which were then cooked at the edge of an oven, referred to as chichiripieno.

Spianata is a variation prepared using eggs and ricotta cheese in the dough mixture. The term spianata originally referred to pieces of flat dough that were used to test an oven's heat prior to cooking.

See also
 List of breads
 List of Italian dishes
 Frybread

References

Further reading
  – Gnocco fritto o crescentina

External links

 Crescentina (deep-fried bread). Academia Barilla.

Italian breads
Emilia-Romagna
Cuisine of Emilia-Romagna